is a Japanese drama series aired in Japan on Fuji Television in 2004. The series is very closely related in style to the first season of Water Boys, except set in a girls school.

Story
Three years ago, the former all-girl Himeno High School opened its doors to male students, but the school still retains its female-dominated environment as the school still has a majority female population. Eikichi Mizushima transfers into the school from a prestigious Aoba High School in Tokyo, where he was previously a member of the swimming team, to be with his grandfather, Kamekichi, while his father was away in New York City starting a new business.

Yōsuke Yamamoto always wanted to have a boys' sports club in the school and, when he heard about Eikichi's involvement with the swim club, decided to make his own. Starting from scratch, the boys must go through similar hardships to start their own swimming club, except this time they have a strong opposition of the female presence.

Cast
 Eikichi Mizushima - Hayato Ichihara
 Shiori Yazawa - Satomi Ishihara
 Yosuke Yamamoto - Akiyoshi Nakao
 Senichi Kawasaki - Keita Saitō
 Iwata Iwao - Teppei Koike
 Hideki Sano - Ryo Kimura
 Hijiri Saotome - Takatoshi Kaneko
 Natsuko Ohara - Sayaka Yamaguchi
 Kayo Oba - Reina Asami
 Haruka Koshino - Waka Inoue
 Kozue Kitagawa - Emi Suzuki
 Reiko Kashiyama - Midoriko Kimura
 Kamekichi Mizushima - Masao Imafuku
 Kaoru Yazawa - Aiko Morishita
 Akira Yazawa - Fumiyo Kohinata
 Kozo Kasuya - Shiro Sano
 Yoko Oshima
 Kiwako Ashikawa - Sachie Hara

References

Related links

Water Boys 2 JDorama page

External links
 

2004 Japanese television series debuts
2004 Japanese television series endings
Japanese drama television series
Fuji TV dramas